Pleurotomella ohlini is a species of sea snail, a marine gastropod mollusk in the family Raphitomidae.

Description
The length of the shell attains 10 mm.

Distribution
This marine species occurs off Argentina, the Falklands and Tierra del Fuego.

References

External links
 Strebel H. (1905). Beiträge zur Kenntnis der Molluskenfauna der Magelhaen-Provinz. No. 3. Zoologische Jahrbücher, Abteilung für Systematik, Geographie und Biologie der Tiere. 22: 575-666, pls 21-24
 Luca, J. D.; Zelaya, D. G. (2019). Gastropods from the Burdwood Bank (southwestern Atlantic): an overview of species diversity. Zootaxa. 4544(1): 41-78
 

ohlini
Gastropods described in 1905